Ascalenia jerichoella is a moth in the family Cosmopterigidae. It is found in Israel.

Adults have been recorded in May.

References

Moths described in 1925
Ascalenia
Moths of Asia
Taxa named by Hans Georg Amsel